64 was a Russian chess magazine and draughts publication, published in Moscow. Its name referred to the number of squares on a chessboard. The magazine awarded the Chess Oscar annually.

History
When it first appeared in 1924, 64 was published as a magazine, but in 1935 it changed to a weekly newspaper. Nikolai Krylenko was the editor from 1924 until his death in 1938 in the Great Purge. The publication was interrupted in 1941 by World War II and resumed after the war. In 1968 it was revamped as a weekly magazine by Alexander Roshal and World Champion Tigran Petrosian. Vasily Smyslov was an assistant editor. Petrosian was editor until 1977 when he was fired after his loss to Viktor Korchnoi in a quarter-final Candidates match.

In 1986 64 published excerpts from Other Shores by Vladimir Nabokov, the first work by Vladimir Nabokov ever openly published in the USSR. Roshal was severely punished even though at that time Anatoly Karpov was editor-in-chief. In 1992 the magazine fell upon hard times and ceased publication but Roshal privatized it and publication was resumed. It was published twice a month until ceasing operation again in 2014.

See also
 List of chess periodicals

References

 
 ChessBase on Alexander Roshal

External links
 Russian website
 English website

1924 establishments in the Soviet Union
2014 disestablishments in Russia
Biweekly magazines
Chess in the Soviet Union
Chess periodicals
Defunct magazines published in Russia
Magazines established in 1924
Magazines disestablished in 2014
Magazines published in Moscow
Russian-language magazines
Sports magazines published in Russia
Weekly magazines published in Russia
Magazines published in the Soviet Union